Massachusetts Senate's Middlesex and Worcester district in the United States is one of 40 legislative districts of the Massachusetts Senate. It covers 8.8% of Middlesex County and 4.8% of Worcester County population in 2010. Democrat Jamie Eldridge of Acton has represented the district since 2009.

Towns represented
The district includes the following localities:
 Acton
 Ayer
 Boxborough
 Harvard
 Hudson
 Littleton
 Marlborough
 Maynard
 Northborough
 Shirley
 Southborough
 Stow
 Sudbury
 Westborough

Senators 
 William I. Randall, circa 1969 
 Edward Lawrence Burke, 1971-1973 
 Chester G. Atkins, circa 1979 
 Paul Cellucci, circa 1985 
 Robert Durand, circa 1993 
 Pam Resor, circa 2002 
 James B. Eldridge, 2009-current

Images
Portraits of legislators

See also
 List of Massachusetts Senate elections
 List of Massachusetts General Courts
 List of former districts of the Massachusetts Senate
 Other Worcester County districts of the Massachusett Senate: 1st, 2nd; Hampshire, Franklin and Worcester; Worcester, Hampden, Hampshire and Middlesex; Worcester and Middlesex; Worcester and Norfolk
 Middlesex County districts of the Massachusetts House of Representatives: 1st, 2nd, 3rd, 4th, 5th, 6th, 7th, 8th, 9th, 10th, 11th, 12th, 13th, 14th, 15th, 16th, 17th, 18th, 19th, 20th, 21st, 22nd, 23rd, 24th, 25th, 26th, 27th, 28th, 29th, 30th, 31st, 32nd, 33rd, 34th, 35th, 36th, 37th
 Worcester County districts of the Massachusetts House of Representatives: 1st, 2nd, 3rd, 4th, 5th, 6th, 7th, 8th, 9th, 10th, 11th, 12th, 13th, 14th, 15th, 16th, 17th, 18th

References

External links
 Ballotpedia
  (State Senate district information based on U.S. Census Bureau's American Community Survey).
 League of Women Voters of Sudbury

Senate
Government of Middlesex County, Massachusetts
Government in Worcester County, Massachusetts
Massachusetts Senate